Mouhammadou Einstein Jaiteh (born 27 November 1994), commonly known as Mam Jaiteh, is a French professional basketball player for Virtus Bologna of the Italian Lega Basket Serie A (LBA) and the EuroLeague. He is of Senegalese and Gambian descent.

Early life and career
In his youth, Jaiteh originally played soccer with friends, before beginning his basketball career at 13. After playing for INSEP for a few years, Jaiteh would participate at the 2010 FIBA Europe Under-16 Championship, and then the FIBA Europe Under-18 Championships in 2011 and 2012. The 2012 championship had Jaiteh leading all competitors in rebounds per game.

Professional career
After being recruited by the Connecticut Huskies, Washington Huskies, Gonzaga Bulldogs, and Virginia Tech Hokies, Jaiteh decided to sign a two year contract to play with the Stade Olympique Maritime Boulonnais of the LNB Pro B (French 2nd Division), where he would get more playing time. During that period, Jaiteh was considered as a finalist for France's Pro B MVP award, due to his performance of averaging 16.2 points and 9.9 rebounds per game, in 27.6 minutes of play per game. On May 3, 2013, Jaiteh ended up being declared the winner of the 2013 LNB Pro B French Player's MVP award, as well as the winner of the LNB Pro B Most Improved Player award.

In 2013, Jaiteh was selected to participate in the Nike Hoop Summit. During the competition, he would score 6 points and grab 9 rebounds, to help the World Team win the competition. Two days after performing in the competition on April 20, Jaiteh decided to officially declare for the 2013 NBA draft. He was projected to go between the late first round and the second round of the draft, but Jaiteh wanted to be convinced that he would be drafted in the first round by somebody. Ultimately, Jaiteh ended up withdrawing from the draft, because of that issue, and he ended up withdrawing alongside fellow Frenchmen Louis Labeyrie and Axel Toupane.

On July 28, 2013, Jaiteh signed a contract with the French team JSF Nanterre. Jaiteh would officially declare for the 2015 NBA draft, in April 2015, after trying to gain earlier recognition as a prospect in the 2014 NBA draft. A few weeks before the 2015 NBA draft took place, Nanterre would win the 2014–15 EuroChallenge championship, with Jaiteh helping the team by grabbing 7 timely rebounds in a close, buzzer-beating 64–63 victory over Trabzonspor Medical Park. As an early entrant in the 2015 NBA draft, he went undrafted.

On July 28, 2016, Jaiteh signed with SIG Strasbourg.

On November 8, 2018, Jaiteh signed a deal with Auxilium Torino.

On July 29, 2019, he has signed with Avtodor Saratov of the VTB United League. 

On June 30, 2020, he has signed with Gaziantep Basketbol of the Turkish Basketbol Süper Ligi (BSL). During the season he was with the team, Jaiteh was the Basketbol Süper Ligi's leading rebounder for that season.

Virtus Bologna (2021–present)
On July 20, 2021, he signed a two-year deal with Virtus Bologna of the Italian Lega Basket Serie A (LBA). On September 21, the team won its second Supercup, defeating Olimpia Milano 90–84. Moreover, after having ousted Lietkabelis, Ulm and Valencia in the first three rounds of the playoffs, on 11 May 2022, Virtus defeated Frutti Extra Bursaspor by 80–67 at the Segafredo Arena, winning its first EuroCup and qualifying for the EuroLeague after 14 years. However, despite having ended the regular season at the first place and having ousted 3–0 both Pesaro and Tortona in the first two rounds of playoffs, Virtus was defeated 4–2 in the national finals by Olimpia Milano.

On 29 September 2022, after having ousted Milano in the semifinals, Virtus won its third Supercup, defeating 72–69 Banco di Sardegna Sassari and achieving a back-to-back, following the 2021 trophy. However, Jaiteh did not play in that game due to an injury.

Personal life
Jaiteh's father descended from Senegal, while his mother descended from the Gambia. Although he is of both Senegalese and Gambian descent, he does not officially hold any Senegalese or Gambian nationality.

Career statistics

EuroLeague

|-
| style="text-align:left;"| 2013–14
| style="text-align:left;"| Nanterre
| 10 || 0 || 12.6 || .559 || .000 || .727 || 3.7 || .3 || .4 || .4 || 4.6 || 6.1
|-
| style="text-align:center;" colspan=2 | Career
| 10 || 0 || 12.6 || .559 || .000 || .727 || 3.7 || .3 || .4 || .4 || 4.6 || 6.1

Honours
 French 2nd Division French Player's MVP (1): 2013
 French 2nd Division Most Improved Player (1): 2013
 French LNB All-Star Game (3): 2013 (Pro B), 2015 (Pro A), 2016 (Pro A)
 FIBA EuroChallenge Champion (1): 2015

References

External links
 Mam Jaiteh at draftexpress.com
 Mam Jaiteh at eurobasket.com
 Mam Jaiteh at euroleague.net
 Mam Jaiteh at lnb.fr
 
 

1994 births
Living people
Auxilium Pallacanestro Torino players
BC Avtodor Saratov players
Black French sportspeople
Centers (basketball)
French expatriates in Italy
French expatriates in Russia
French expatriate basketball people in Turkey
French men's basketball players
French sportspeople of Gambian descent
French sportspeople of Senegalese descent
Gaziantep Basketbol players
Lega Basket Serie A players
Limoges CSP players
Nanterre 92 players
People from Pantin
Power forwards (basketball)
SIG Basket players
SOMB Boulogne-sur-Mer players
Sportspeople from Seine-Saint-Denis
Virtus Bologna players